Jonathan Leavitt (1764–1830) was a prominent Greenfield, Massachusetts attorney, judge, state senator  and businessman for whom the architect Asher Benjamin designed the Leavitt House, now the Leavitt-Hovey House on Main Street, in 1797.

Judge Leavitt was born in Walpole, N.H., but was raised in Greenfield, where his father Rev. Jonathan Leavitt served as a Congregational minister. Leavitt attended Yale College, taught school in New Haven, and then achieved early prominence as a lawyer in Greenfield. He subsequently served as chief justice of the Court of Common Pleas in 1812, and Judge of Probate from 1814 to 1821. Judge Leavitt used the west wing of the Leavitt-Hovey house for his business activities. He was a founder and first president of The Franklin Bank of Greenfield in 1822.

Judge Leavitt was also known for his legal writings, especially in probate law, as well as his "Summary of the Laws of Massachusetts, Relative to the Settlement, Support, Employment and Removal of Paupers", published in Greenfield in 1810. He also published two small volumes on religion.

Judge Leavitt married Emelia Stiles, daughter of President Ezra Stiles of Yale College, for whom today's Ezra Stiles College at Yale is named. Rev. Jonathan Leavitt, Judge Leavitt's father, was also a graduate of Yale and a native of Suffield, Connecticut. Rev. Leavitt's wife was Sarah Hooker, great-great-granddaughter of the Rev. Thomas Hooker, New England divine and chief founder of the Colony of Connecticut.

Members of the Leavitt family became prominent in nearby Charlemont and Heath, and were noted for their abolitionist activities. (Rev. Joshua Leavitt, born in nearby Heath, Massachusetts, was a member of this family.) Judge Leavitt's household had three African-American servants, and on the death of her father Ezra Stiles Mrs. Leavitt inherited her father's two elderly slaves Newport and his wife Nabby.

Judge Leavitt died in Greenfield in 1830. He and the former Emelia Stiles had four daughters, including Sarah Hooker Leavitt, Mary Hooker Leavitt, Emilia Stiles Leavitt (later Mrs. E. T. Foote), and a son Jonathan, who died in 1821 while attending Yale College, an event that threw his father into profound depression. In 1822 his sister compiled a memoir devoted to her brother entitled "Memoir of Jonathan Leavitt, a Member of the Junior Class in Yale College, who Died at New-Haven the 10th of May, 1821, Aged 18 Years." The book, whose author was described as "a sister", was published by S. Converse in New Haven in 1822.

See also

 Jonathan Leavitt (minister)
 Leavitt-Hovey House

References

External links
Quincy, Wendell, Holmes, and Upham Family Papers, 1633–1910 (see Leavitt family correspondence), Massachusetts Historical Society

1764 births
1830 deaths
American Congregationalists
Leavitt family
Massachusetts lawyers
Massachusetts state court judges
Massachusetts state senators
Yale College alumni
People from Greenfield, Massachusetts
19th-century American lawyers